The Zhu Dayu Culture Museum is a museum about fish in Su'ao Township, Yilan County, Taiwan.

Exhibition
The museum exhibits various artifacts and information regarding sea creatures and their food products, such as red coral, canned fish, fixed-meal packages, fresh foods etc.

Transportation
The museum is accessible within walking distance southeast of Su'ao Station of Taiwan Railways.

See also
 List of museums in Taiwan

References

External links
 

Food museums in Taiwan
Museums in Yilan County, Taiwan